East Park Dam is an agricultural irrigation dam and reservoir built by the United States Bureau of Reclamation, on Little Stony Creek, about  southwest of Orland, California on the northern end of the California Central Valley.

The dam was completed in 1910.

The California Office of Environmental Health Hazard Assessment (OEHHA) has developed an advisory for the East Park Reservoir based on mercury and PCBs found in fish caught from this water body. The advisory provides safe eating advice for species caught in the body of water.

The Orland Project
The East Park dam and reservoir was one element of the Orland Project in the area, one of the earliest, and one of the smallest, ever undertaken by the Bureau.  Other components of the project include:

 the 1928 Stony Gorge Dam and Reservoir, on Stony Creek about 18 miles downstream from East Park Dam, an early example of an Ambursen-type dam
 the 1914 Rainbow Diversion Dam
 the 1913 Northside Diversion Dam, rebuilt in the 1950s
 and a canal and distribution system with 17 miles of canals and 117 miles of lateral connections

Still functioning, the local Orland Unit Water Users' Association has operated the project since October 1, 1954. It was added to the National Register of Historic Places in the 1980s.

Climate

According to the Köppen Climate Classification system, East Park Reservoir has a hot-summer mediterranean climate, abbreviated "Csa" on climate maps.

See also
List of dams and reservoirs in California

References 

Arch dams
Buildings and structures in Colusa County, California
Dams completed in 1910
Dams in California
Dams on the National Register of Historic Places in California
United States Bureau of Reclamation dams
Dams in the Sacramento River basin
National Register of Historic Places in Colusa County, California